Martin "The Viper" Foley (born 24 November 1952) is a well-known Irish criminal. He rose from a street drug dealer to become an associate of Martin Cahill. Foley has 40 convictions, and is considered a key figure in the McCormack-Foley crime family from Crumlin, Dublin. He has had several attempts on his life including being shot on five occasions, most recently on 26 January 2008. Foley was shot a number of times outside the Carlisle gym on Kimmage Road West, South Dublin. The men behind the attack were involved in a separate gun feud, which has since run its course because the main players are all either dead or in prison. Foley has kept a lower profile since then.

A well known Dublin gangland criminal, Foley's first conviction was in 1968. Since then he has been a member of Martin Cahill's criminal gang, and jailed for numerous offences including breaking a police officer's jaw.

An attack on 26 January 2008 was the fourth time Foley has been shot; in 1995 outside Fatima Mansions, in 1996 by the convicted murderer Brian Meehan, and in 2000 as he left a swimming pool in Terenure. This shooting is believed to be linked to the Crumlin-Drimnagh feud, with Foley aligned to one of the feuding gangs. He was also abducted by the Provisional IRA in 1984, but escaped following a shoot-out in Phoenix Park between the kidnappers and Gardaí.

References

Further reading
Lyder, Andre. Pushers Out: The Inside Story of Dublin's Anti-Drugs Movement. Victoria, British Columbia: Trafford Publishing, 2005;

External links
An Artful Dodge, time.com 
Foley appeal adjourned for report, rte.ie 
RTE News - Court reserves decision on Foley application, rte.ie

1952 births
Living people
Irish crime bosses
Irish gangsters
Kidnapped Irish people
Criminals from Dublin (city)